American Crime is an American anthology crime drama television series created by John Ridley that premiered on ABC on March 5, 2015. On May 11, 2017, ABC cancelled the series after three seasons.

Series overview

Episodes

Season 1 (2015)

Season 2 (2016)

Season 3 (2017)

Ratings

References

External links
 

Lists of American crime drama television series episodes